Georges Ifrah (1947 – 1 November 2019) was a teacher of mathematics, a French author and a self-taught historian of mathematics, especially numerals.

His work, From One to Zero: A Universal History of Numbers (1985, 1994) was translated into multiple languages, became an international bestseller, and was included in American Scientist'''s list of "100 or so Books that shaped a Century of Science", referring to the 20th century. Despite popular acclaim, it has been broadly criticized by scholars.C. Philipp E. Nothaft: Medieval Europe’s satanic ciphers: on the genesis of a modern myth. British Journal for the History of Mathematics 35, 2020, doi:10.1080/26375451.2020.1726050.

Publications
Several books devoted to numbers and history of numbers and number related topics including:

 1981: Histoire Universelle des Chiffres (Paris)
 English translation (1985): From one to zero. A universal history of numbers transl. by Lowell Bair. New York: Viking Penguin Inc. XVI, 503 pages. (Zentralblatt review: 0589.01001: "It is the richness in documents from both primitive and advanced cultures, which makes this publication unique.[…]a number of authors mentioned in the text are not cited in this bibliography. And in many cases the sources of illustrations remain anonymous".)
 German translation (1986): Universalgeschichte der Zahlen transl. by Alexander von Platen. Frankfurt/New York: Campus Verlag. 580 pages. (Zentralblatt review 0606.01023.)
 German translation (1989): Universalgeschichte der Zahlen.  600 pages. (Additional introduction and indices.) (Zentralblatt review: 0686.01001.)
 Italian translation (1983): Storia universale dei numeri.  Milano: Mondadori. 585 pages.
 1985: Les chiffres ou l'histoire d'une grande invention Robert Laffont
 "The history of numbers or the history of a great discovery" (abridged version? ≈260 pages)
 Polish translation (1990): Dzieje liczby czyli historia wielkiego wynalazku translated by Stanisław Hartman. Wrocław: Zakład Narodowy im. Ossolińskich-Wydawnictwo Polskiej Akademii Nauk (Ossolineum). 260 pages. . (Zentralblatt review: 0758.01017.)
 1994: Histoire universelle des chiffres, 2nd edition. (Seghers, puis Bouquins, Robert Laffont, 1994)
 Now in two volumes: Vol I 633 pages  (Zentralblatt review: 0955.01002), Vol II 412 pages  (Zentralblatt review: 0969.68001).
 Norwegian translation (1997): All verdens tall. Tallenes kulturhistorie. I, II. Translated by Anne Falken, Guri Haarr, Margrethe Kvarenes and Svanhild Solløs. Oslo: Pax Forlag. 1284 p. (1997).  (set); (vol.1);  (vol.2). (Zentralblatt review: 0933.01001)
 English translation (1998): Universal History of Numbers: From Prehistory to the Invention of the Computer. Translated by David Bellos, E.F. Harding, Sophie Wood and Ian Monk.  Harville Press, London, 1998.
 American edition of English tr., Volume 1 (2000): The Universal History of Numbers: From prehistory to the invention of the computer. Translated by David Bellos, E.F. Harding, Sophie Wood and Ian Monk. John Wiley and Sons Inc., 2000.
 American edition of English tr, Volume 2 (2001): The Universal History of Computing: From the Abacus to the Quantum Computer'' with E. F. Harding.

References

French historians of mathematics
20th-century French historians
1947 births
2019 deaths
French male non-fiction writers